Štavalj is a village in the municipality of Sjenica, Serbia. It had a population of 312 at the 2011 census.

Notable residents
 Dragi Kaličanin, football player

References

Populated places in Zlatibor District